Ianniello is a surname of Italian origin. Notable people with the surname include: 

Joseph Ianniello (born 1968), American media executive
Matthew Ianniello (1920–2012), New York mobster with the Genovese crime family

Italian-language surnames
Patronymic surnames
Surnames from given names